Howard Alvin "Dizzy" Sutherland (April 9, 1922 – August 26, 1979) was a Major League Baseball pitcher who played in  with the Washington Senators. He batted and threw left-handed.

He was born and died in Washington, D.C.

External links

1922 births
1979 deaths
Major League Baseball pitchers
Baseball players from Washington, D.C.
Washington Senators (1901–1960) players